George William Odey CBE DL (21 April 1900 – 16 October 1985) was a Conservative Party politician in the United Kingdom who served as a Member of Parliament (MP) from 1947 to 1955.

He was educated at Faversham Grammar School and University College London.

He was elected as MP for the Howdenshire constituency at a by-election in 1947. When that constituency was abolished in boundary changes for the 1950 general election, he was returned to the House of Commons at for the newly recreated Beverley constituency, and held the seat until its abolition for the 1955 general election.

On 18 November 1952 he was made Honorary Air Commodore of No. 3505 (East Riding) Fighter Control Unit, Royal Auxiliary Air Force. On 7 February 1977 he was made a Deputy Lieutenant for the County of Humberside.

References

Sources

External links 
 

1900 births
1985 deaths
People educated at Queen Elizabeth's Grammar School, Faversham
Alumni of University College London
Commanders of the Order of the British Empire
Deputy Lieutenants in England
Conservative Party (UK) MPs for English constituencies
UK MPs 1945–1950
UK MPs 1950–1951
UK MPs 1951–1955
Honorary air commodores
George